The Lash of Power is a 1917 American silent drama film directed by Harry Solter and starring Kenneth Harlan, Carmel Myers and Helen Wright.

Cast
 Kenneth Harlan as John Rand
 Carmel Myers as Marion Sherwood
 Helen Wright as Mrs. C.W. Sherwood
 Charles Hill Mailes as Charles W. Sherwood
 T.D. Crittenden as Rex Reynolds
 Jack Nelson as Oliver Mullen
 Gertrude Astor as Phyllis Ward

References

Bibliography
 Michael Slade Shull. Radicalism in American Silent Films, 1909-1929: A Filmography and History. McFarland, 2015.

External links
 

1917 films
1917 drama films
1910s English-language films
American silent feature films
Silent American drama films
American black-and-white films
Universal Pictures films
Films directed by Harry Solter
1910s American films